Nahuievychi (Nahuyevychi, old name – Solne, Bashevo, from 1951 to 2009 – Ivana-Franka) (Polish: Nahujowice) is a village in Drohobych Raion, Lviv Oblast, Ukraine. It belongs to Drohobych urban hromada, one of the hromadas of Ukraine.

Nahuyevychi is the birthplace of poet and writer Ivan Franko (1856–1916).  Ivan Franko was a famous Ukrainian activist, a Ukrainian poet, writer, doctor of philosophy, ethnographer. Franko was born in Nahuyevichi in Austrian-controlled eastern Galicia, today part of Lviv Oblast (oblast of Ukraine), and was the son of a village blacksmith, of German ancestry.  The village is the location of the Nahuyevychi State Historical and Cultural Preserve, a Ukrainian historic site designated in 1994. 

The village covers an area of 28.711 km2 and the population of village is about 2,518 persons.
Local government is administered by Nahuievytska village council.

Geography 

History 
The first written mention dates back to year 1050 and had the name Solne, afterwards Bashevo. The village was called Nahuyevychi from 1240.

Nahuyevychi State Historical and Cultural Preserve
The "Nahuyevychi State Historical and Cultural Preserve" is a "Reserve of Regional State Administration" of the Lviv Oblast, which was designated on  March 10, 1994. The preserve structure includes: the writer's parents' lodge, the I. Franko Museum, I. Franko and world literature sculptural composition, I. Franko's Path art-memorial complex.

In the village there are Franko's farmstead and museum.

Other monuments
The village also has two architectural historic sites of architecture Drohobych district:
 Church of St. Nicholas (wooden) 1800 (1352 /1)
 The bell tower of the church of St. Nicholas (wooden) 1800 (1352 /2)

References

External links 
 weather.in.ua
 village Nahuievychi
 THE LIFE OF IVAN FRANKO
 Franko's contributions recalled on his 150th anniversary
  Encyclopedia of the life and works of Ivan Franko

Literature 
 Історія міст і сіл УРСР: Львівська область, Івана Франка. – К. : ГРУРЕ, 1968 р. Page 286 

Villages in Drohobych Raion